Terelliini is a tribe of fruit flies in the family Tephritidae. There are at least six genera and about 104 described species in Terelliini.

Genera
These four genera belong to the tribe Terelliini:
Chaetorellia Hendel, 1927
Chaetostomella Hendel, 1927
Craspedoxantha Bezzi, 1913
Neaspilota Osten-Sacken, 1878
Orellia Robineau-Desvoidy, 1830
Terellia Robineau-Desvoidy, 1830

References

Further reading

External links

 
 

Tephritinae